Menno Oosting and Libor Pimek were the defending champions, but competed this year with different partners. Oosting teamed up with Federico Mordegan and lost in the first round to Saša Hiršzon and Goran Ivanišević, while Pimek teamed up with Filip Dewulf and also lost in the first round to Jon Ireland and Jack Waite.

Wayne Arthurs and Simon Youl won the title by defeating Jordi Arrese and José Antonio Conde 6–4, 6–4 in the final.

Seeds

Draw

Draw

References

External links
 Official results archive (ATP)
 Official results archive (ITF)

1994 Doubles
Doubles
1994 in Romanian tennis